Homalopoma cunninghami is a species of small sea snail with calcareous opercula, a marine gastropod mollusk in the family Colloniidae.

Description
The height of the shell varies between 4 mm and 5.5 mm. The small, rose-madder shell has a subglobose shape. It is, perforate in the young state, but when adult imperforate, It contains 42 whorls, the apical one whitish, the rest convex, and finely spirally striated. The shell is also marked with faint oblique lines of growth. The suture is rather deep. The body whorl descends obliquely near the lip. It is somewhat flattened beneath near the center. The aperture is obliquely subcircular and iridescent within. The pearly columella is spread over the umbilicus. The labrum has a narrow pinkish margin within.

Distribution
This marine species is found at depths between 13 m and 665 m off Patagonia, Tierra del Fuego and the Falkland Islands.

References

External links
 To Antarctic Invertebrates
 To Biodiversity Heritage Library (1 publication)
 To Encyclopedia of Life
 To USNM Invertebrate Zoology Mollusca Collection
 To World Register of Marine Species
 

Colloniidae
Gastropods described in 1881